A collective is a group whose members share a common interest or goal.

Collective or The Collective may also refer to:

Organizations
 The Ayn Rand Collective or "The Collective"
 Camden Collective, a London-based regeneration project
 The Collective (company), an American video game developer
 The Collective (mountain biking), producers of mountain biking movies

Film and television
 "Collective" (Law & Order: Criminal Intent), 2005 episode
 "Collective" (Star Trek: Voyager), 2000 episode
 The Collective (2008 film), an American independent horror movie
 Collective (2019 film), a Romanian documentary film

Music
 The Collective (band), an Australian boy band
 The Collective, a British charity supergroup who recorded a cover of Massive Attack's "Teardrop"

Albums
 Collective (Clock DVA album), 1994
 Collective (I've album), 2005
 Collective (Stavesacre album), 2001
 The Collective (Cecil Brooks III album), 1979
 The Collective (Scale the Summit album), 2011
 The Collective (The Collective album), 2012

Other uses
 Collective Man, a Chinese superhero comics character
 The Collective (comics), a mutant comics character
 Collective (BBC), a now-dormant online interactive culture magazine hosted by bbc.co.uk
 Collective, one of the helicopter flight controls

See also
 Colectivo (disambiguation) for the Spanish term